Martin Labaška (born 28 August 1982) is a Slovak football striker who currently plays for the Slovak 2. liga club MFK Tatran Liptovský Mikuláš.

References

External links
at imscouting.com

1982 births
Living people
Slovak footballers
Association football forwards
MFK Ružomberok players
FC DAC 1904 Dunajská Streda players
MFK Tatran Liptovský Mikuláš players
Slovak Super Liga players
Expatriate footballers in Austria